"Everything's Been Changed" is a song written by Paul Anka and performed by The 5th Dimension.  The song was produced by Bones Howe and arranged by Bill Holman, Bob Alcivar, and Howe.

Chart performance
It reached #17 on the Canadian adult contemporary chart, #18 on the U.S. adult contemporary chart, #49 on the Canadian pop chart, and #70 on the Billboard Hot 100 in 1973.  It was featured on their 1973 album, Living Together, Growing Together.

Other versions
Anka released the original version of the song as the B-side to his 1972 single, "Jubilation".
Anne Murray released a version of the song on her 1972 album, Annie.

References

1972 songs
1973 singles
Songs written by Paul Anka
Paul Anka songs
The 5th Dimension songs
Anne Murray songs
Song recordings produced by Bones Howe
Bell Records singles